Psi Octantis, Latinized from ψ Octantis, is a solitary star in the southern circumpolar constellation Octans. It has an apparent magnitude of 5.47, allowing it to be seen with the naked eye under ideal conditions.

Psi Octantis has a spectral classification of F0IIp, suggesting that it is a bright giant but with peculiarities.  Other assessments give a luminosity class of III (giant), III-IV (intermediate between giant and subgiant), or V: (approximately main sequence).    One paper gives a spectral class of  F4V:kA5, indicating that it is a probable F-type main-sequence star with the calcium K-lines of an A5 star, including sharp absorption lines of metals.  Analysis of its evolutionary stage show it to be a somewhat evolved main sequence star.

It has 149% the mass of the Sun and 1.74 times the radius of the Sun. It shines at 7.82 times the luminosity of the Sun from its photosphere at an effective temperature of 7,244 K, giving it a yellowish white glow. Psi Octantis has an iron abundance 91% that of the Sun and is estimated to be 1.41 billion years old.

References

Octans
F-type bright giants
210853
110078
8471
Octantis, 60
Octantis, Psi
PD-78 1442